is a Japanese actor and singer. After winning the Grand Prix prize at the Bacs Award 2013, he was signed to their agency and debuted with the boy band B2takes!, of which he was a member until leaving the group in 2018. His debut acting role is Rat in Kamen Rider Gaim (2013), and in the following years, he starred in the television dramas Dansui! Ozawa also starred in several stage productions, including Ace of Diamond: The Live, the Hakuoki musicals, Osomatsu-san, Uta no Prince-sama, and Ensemble Stars!

Career

Ozawa won the Grand Prix prize at the Bacs Award 2013, which jump-started his acting career. In November 2018, Ozawa left the boy band B2takes!!, and his graduation ceremony took place during the group's 6th anniversary concert.

Following domestic abuse reports in December 2020, Ozawa was dismissed from his agency. Subsequently, he was removed from upcoming projects, including the stage play adaptations of Le Petit Prince and Night Flight. In addition, his voice clips were removed from A3! and replaced by Tomoru Akazawa's. In September 2021, Ozawa stated through an interview with Shukan Bunshun that he had no plans on returning to entertainment. However, on October 8, 2022, Ozawa announced through his Twitter account that he was continuing his career.

Personal life

In December 2020, Shūkan Bunshun published allegations from his ex-girlfriend stating that Ozawa physically assaulted her throughout their 5-year relationship. The two began dating in 2015, beginning from when his ex-girlfriend was 16 years old, and moved in together in Setagaya, Tokyo in 2019 until she moved out in September 2020. Ozawa's ex-girlfriend alleged that he assaulted her regularly, especially during sexual intercourse, and that he had once forced her into getting an abortion after she became pregnant. On August 31, 2020, a neighbor called the police after hearing her being physically abused, but charges were not filed. On November 28, 2020, his ex-girlfriend attempted suicide before a friend intervened. On December 14, 2020, AIS, Ozawa's agency, terminated his contract, stating that he confirmed the reports. Ozawa issued a statement of regret on his Twitter account. He later followed up by denying his agency's statement and retweeting his lawyer but has since removed the tweets.

After months of silence, Ozawa returned to Twitter on August 12, 2021, posting on his 30th birthday a formal apology for troubling fans and colleagues. On August 30, 2021, through an interview with the magazine Weekly Josei Prime, Ozawa denied the allegations, saying that he never forced his ex-girlfriend into having an abortion nor hit her stomach, and their sexual acts consisted of BDSM with her consent. He also stated that she had physically assaulted him and drew a kitchen knife against him on November 28, 2020 after he had tried to relocate. Through an interview with Shūkan Bunshun, Ozawa also commented on the backlash regarding dating his ex-girlfriend when she was still a minor, stating that her family had given him consent to do so.

Filmography

Television

Film

Theater

Music video

Video game

Drama CD

References

External links
  

1991 births
Living people
21st-century Japanese male actors
Japanese male film actors
Japanese male television actors
Japanese male stage actors